Omar Souleyman is a Syrian Arab Singer from the village of Ras al-Ain near the Syria–Turkey border but grew up in the city of Tell Tamer. He started his career as a part-time wedding singer in his native al-Hasakah Governorate, and while he is a Sunni Arab, he emphasises the influence its culturally diverse milieu has had on his style: "My music is from the community I come from – the Kurdish, the Ashuri, the Arabic, they're all in this community. Even Turkish because it's so near, it's just across the border."

Career

Omar Souleyman began his career in 1994, working with a number of musicians with whom he still performs. He has released an estimated five hundred studio and live albums under his name. Eighty percent of those releases are recordings made at weddings and presented to the married couple, which are later copied and sold at local kiosks. The originality of his music is due to the fact that it mixes sounds of keyboards, electronic beats and vocals.

In October 2013 a newly recorded album Wenu Wenu was released by UK label Ribbon Music.

Collaborations and notable appearances
He appeared at the Glastonbury Festival in 2011, and performed during Chaos in Tejas in Austin, Texas in June 2011. In August 2011, Omar Souleyman appeared at Paredes de Coura in Portugal. Souleyman was chosen by Caribou to perform at the ATP Nightmare Before Christmas festival that they co-curated in December 2011 in Minehead, England.

In 2011 he recorded three remixes for Björk's Biophilia, all found on the second disc of her "Crystalline Series".

In 2013 he worked with British producer Four Tet on his album Wenu Wenu. He collaborated with Four Tet again on his 2015 release Bahdeni Nami.

In August 2013, before his performance at the Way Out West festival in Gothenburg, Sweden, Swedish authorities initially denied his artist visa out of concern that he would request asylum. His visa was granted two days before the festival. In December 2013, he performed at the Nobel Peace Prize Concert in Oslo, Norway.

In June 2014 he performed at The Bonnaroo Music and Arts Festival in Manchester, Tennessee. In July he performed at Roskilde Festival, Denmark and at the Mostly Jazz, Funk and Soul Festival, in Birmingham, UK. He then performed at One Love Festival in Istanbul on 16 June 2014. In August 2014 he performed at Pukkelpop Festival in Kiewit, Hasselt in Belgium. Later that summer on 31 August he played the Electric Picnic festival in Ireland. He also played at Treefort Music Festival in Boise, Idaho in March 2015. In October 2017 he performed at Bristol's SimpleThings festival.

Personal life 
Souleyman has been living in Turkey since the start of the Syrian Civil War in 2011, which heavily impacted his home region. While in Turkey, Souleyman established a free bakery in the border town of Akçakale, in order to serve poor families from Turkey and Syria refugees. In November 2021, he was arrested on charges of terrorism, with the Turkish authorities alleging that he was a member of the Kurdistan Workers' Party (PKK). Souleyman was released two days later.

Discography 

Albums
 2006: Highway to Hassake (compilation) (Sublime Frequencies)
 2009: Dabke 2020 (compilation) (Sublime Frequencies)
 2010: Jazeera Nights (compilation) (Sublime Frequencies)
 2011: Haflat Gharbia - The Western Concerts (2LP (compilation)) (Sublime Frequencies)
 2011: Leh Jani (2LP,  full-length Syrian tape reissue) (Sham Palace)
 2013: Wenu Wenu (Ribbon Music)
 2015: Bahdeni Nami (Monkeytown)
 2017: To Syria, with Love (Mad Decent)
 2019: Shlon (Mad Decent)

References

External links 

 Official website

20th-century Syrian male singers
Living people
People from Al-Hasakah Governorate
21st-century Syrian male singers
Syrian farmers
1966 births
Arabic-language singers
Mad Decent artists
Dabke dancers